Omar Madha is a British television director and producer. He has directed numerous episodes of British television such as Hollyoaks, Spooks and Law & Order: UK as well as American television such as Law & Order: Criminal Intent, Big Love and Caprica.

Filmography
Hollyoaks
Attachments
Clocking Off
Rose and Maloney 
Love My Way
Spooks
Burn Up
Law & Order: UK
Paradox
Law & Order: Criminal Intent
Caprica
Big Love
Outcasts
Hellcats
Covert Affairs
Grimm
Defiance 
The 100
24: Live Another Day 
Stalker
The Blacklist
Code Black
MacGyver
Turn: Washington's Spies
Lethal Weapon
S.W.A.T. 
The Rookie
Another Life
Prodigal Son 
Doom Patrol
Star Trek: Discovery
Reacher (TV series)
The Endgame

References

External links

British expatriates in the United States
British television directors
Living people
Place of birth missing (living people)
Alumni of the University of Leeds
1968 births